Neog (Assamese: নেওগ) is a surname of Assamese origin.

People with this surname include:
 Ajanta Neog, Indian politician
 Dimbeswar Neog, Indian writer and poet
 Maheshwar Neog, Indian academic
 Nagen Neog, Indian politician

Ahom kingdom
Assamese-language surnames